Inzopa is a private financial data network that stores financial data for sharing with financial services. The network is primarily used by homebuyers, homeowners, and banks for real estate and mortgage transactions. Inzopa does not charge consumers but financial institutions and professionals must pay a fee. The firm uses crowdsourcing to aggregate mortgage broker and real estate data to build authenticated profiles and matches agents and brokers to homebuyers. Inzopa was co-founded by Charanjeet Ajmani, an executive at Advisor Software, and Brian Barrick, architect and team leader of Apple's FileMaker team in December 2010. The site was launched in February 2014.

Inzopa competes against online loan sites such as LendingTree.

References

External links
 

Companies based in Fremont, California
Internet properties established in 2010
Privately held companies based in California
2010 establishments in California